The Ve.n.to is an IBA official cocktail made of Grappa, honey syrup, fresh lemon juice, and chamomile liqueur.

See also
 List of cocktails

References

Cocktails